Vatne is a village in Ålesund Municipality in Møre og Romsdal county, Norway. The village of Vatne is located at the southern end of the Vatnefjorden in the eastern part of Haram Municipality. Other neighboring villages in the Vatne area include Eidsvik and Tennfjord to the south and Helle to the north of it.

The village of Vatne is the location of Vatne Church. The village was the administrative centre of the old Vatne Municipality which existed from 1902 until 1965.

References

Villages in Møre og Romsdal
Ålesund